Alex Smith (born 29 October 1938) is an English footballer who played as a goalkeeper in the Football League in the 1960s and 1970s, notably with Halifax Town.

He was the Accrington Stanley goalkeeper in all their games in the 1961–62 season, but following their resignation from the league, their results were expunged and he is not shown officially to have played any league games for them.

After Accrington's demise he moved to Bolton Wanderers, and then on to Halifax Town for whom he made over 300 league appearances. His final league club was Preston North End.

He later became the goalkeeping coach at Bolton's academy, leaving the club in 2009, and he then went to run his family-owned Bolton Bed Centre store.

References

External links
Halifax Town Team Photo 1971

1938 births
Sportspeople from Lancaster, Lancashire
Association football goalkeepers
English Football League players
Accrington Stanley F.C. (1891) players
Bolton Wanderers F.C. players
Halifax Town A.F.C. players
Preston North End F.C. players
Living people
English footballers